The Istana Terengganu is the official city-residence of the Sultan of Terengganu and the royal family, in Kuala Lumpur, Malaysia. It is located at Jalan Tun Razak, close to the Royal Selangor Golf Club. Neighbouring next to it is the Istana Perlis.

The building is modern, but has traditional Malay motifs and designs incorporated into it.

Since 2006, Mizan Zainal Abidin, 17th Sultan of Terengganu is the official 13th Yang di-Pertuan Agong until 2011. As king of Malaysia, he and the immediate royal family reside at the Istana Negara instead.

External links

Royal residences in Malaysia
Terengganu
Terengganu